Formia War Memorial (Italian: monumento ai caduti di Formia) is an Italian war memorial erected in 1926 to commemorate the dead of the First World War and earlier conflicts.

The bronze statue entitled Sacraficio depicts a soldier, larger than life size, wearing an Adrian helmet, and trousers with puttees and boots, but bare-chested, standing with both arms raised, as if offering himself in sacrifice. The pedestal has a carved decorative frieze around its top edge, and the front has a carving of a female figure bearing a palm frond and holding a laurel branch over a dedicatory inscription "AI CADUTI / PER LA INDIPENDENZA E LA GRANDEZZA DELLA PATRIA // FORMIA / ORGOGLIOSA E RICCONOSCENTE" ("To the fallen / for the independence and greatness of the fatherland // Formia / proud and recognising").  

On the rear are the inscriptions "DORA OHLFSEN / SCULTRICE / 1924" and two lines from the 1818 poem All'Italia ("To Italy") by the poet Giacomo Leopardi: "ALMA TERRA NATIA, / LA VITA CHE MI DESTI ECCO TI RENDO" ("Dear land of my birth, / The life you gave to me here I give back.").  The sides are inscribed with the names of 120 war dead from Formia, killed in the First World War and earlier conflicts, including the Battle of Lissa (1866), the Battle of Adwa (1896), and the Italo-Turkish War (1911–12)

The Australian sculptor Dora Ohlfsen-Bagge (1869–1948) received a commission from the Italian government to create the sculpture around 1923, reportedly due to her friendship with Duke  (1874–1939).  It is claimed that she was the only woman in Italy and the only non-Italian to have been awarded such a commission.  She first completed a plaster model, which was then cast in bronze, reportedly using bronze from captured guns, and completed around February 1925. The model for the bronze statue may have been Fulco's son Luigi Tosti di Valminuta (1871–1958).  

The memorial was unveiled on Sunday 18 July 1926, at a ceremony attended by the Italian government minister Pietro Fedele, Marshal Armando Diaz, Admirals  and Giuseppe Sirianni, 
the Archbishop of Gaeta,
 
war veterans, and a large crowd of spectators.  An Italian navy vessel in the harbour fired a salute.  The strong masculine sculpture was considered a fitting commemorative work by the Fascist government of Benito Mussolini.  

There was suggestion that the statue should be removed in the Second World War, so the bronze could be reused in the war effort, as despite the work's historical and patriotic value, it was said to have little artistic value.  In the event, the memorial remained in place.  It was restored in 2008.

References

 Monumento ai caduti della prima guerra mondiale, Catalogo generale dei Beni Culturi, Istituto centrale per il catalogo e la documentazione, Ministero dei beni e delle attività culturali e del turismo
 Scheda complete (PDF), Ministero dei beni e delle attività culturali e del turismo 
 Formia, Scultura Monumentale
 Dora Ohlfsen in front of her Formia war memorial with the plaque awarding her the Freedom of the City, 18 July 1926, Dora Ohlfsen archive, Art Gallery of New South Wales
 Dedication of the Formia war memorial by Dora Ohlfsen, 18 July 1926, Dora Ohlfsen archive, Art Gallery of New South Wales
 Image of 'Sacrifice' 1926 by Dora Ohlfsen, 1926, Dora Ohlfsen archive, Art Gallery of New South Wales
 Image of the head of the figure of 'Sacrifice' from the Formia war memorial by Dora Ohlfsen, 1926, Dora Ohlfsen archive, Art Gallery of New South Wales
 Italian balilla boy scouts give the fascist salute at the dedication of Dora Ohlfsen’s Formia war memorial, Italy, 18 July 1926, Dora Ohlfsen archive, Art Gallery of New South Wales
 Dora Ohlfsen with the plaster cast of 'Sacrifice', the central figure of her 1926 Formia war memorial, Italy, circa 1925, Dora Ohlfsen archive, Art Gallery of New South Wales
 Image of design for the figure on the pedestal of the Formia war memorial by Dora Ohlfsen, circa 1924, Dora Ohlfsen archive, Art Gallery of New South Wales
 Annotated postcard depicting the Piazza della Vittoria and war memorial by Dora Ohlfsen at Formia, July 1926, Dora Ohlfsen archive, Art Gallery of New South Wales
 Formia Today, southlazioitaly.com
 Giornata mondiale della Cri a Formia, radioluna.it, 10 May 2016
 Il soldato del monumento ai caduti di Formia rappresenta la figura del Conte Luigi Tosti Di Valminuta, Formia e la sua storia… di Raffaele Capolino, 7 November 2017
 Negli Anni 1940/42 questi due monumenti in bronzo di Formia rischiarono di essere fusi e trasformati in cannoni, Formia e la sua storia… di Raffaele Capolino,10 June 2017
 Monumento ai Caduti [in piazza della Vittoria], Archivio Storico Istituto Luce 

World War I memorials in Italy
Buildings and structures in the Province of Latina
Formia
Cultural infrastructure completed in 1926